The Güell Foundation is a non-profit organization for artists in Catalonia, Spain, created in August 1957 by Joan Antoni Güell i López, Count of Güell.  Since the beginning its main aim has been to protect financially through grants painters, sculptors, musicians and other artists and students of art, mainly Catalan, being able to extend this to other artists in Valencia and the Balearic Islands.

The foundation has also participated in other artistic activities, has collaborated with museums and art institutions, and a fund of art. The main activity that has been developing the foundation, which has concentrated most of its economic performance, has been granting scholarships to young artists and students of art, currently granting scholarships in the fields of music, painting, sculpture and drawing.

Note that this is the work carried out with the full support of the members who make up the board, both institutional and private. The institutional board members are prestigious organizations: the Catalan Royal Academy of Fine Arts of Sant Jordi, the Royal Artistic Circle-Barcelona Institute of Art, the Art Circle of St. Luke and the Orfeo Catalan.

Each year a scholarship is given to a candidate in each category convened, as the selection of the jury agrees. It's intended to be a recognition of the effort and study, and a grant to start developing their vocation.

Awarded Artists by the Foundation from 1974 to 2000 
 1974 - Painting : Alfonso Costa Beiro, Luis Fraile, Antonio Alegre Cremades, Bayod Serafini
 1975 - Music : Francesc Civil, Josep Valls
 1976 - Music : Josep Valls Royo
 1980 - Music : Josep M. Vaqué Vidal
 1982 - Painting : Romà Panadès Anton, Music : Jordi Camell Ilari
 1983 - Sculpture : Alicia Alegre
 1984 - Painting : Leticia Feduchi, Music : Nuria Cullell Ramis
 1985 - Sculpture : Jaime de Córdoba
 1986 - Painting : Jordi Isern, Music : Maria Antonia Juan Nebot
 1987 - Sculpture : Josep Ignasi Alegre Barenys
 1988 - Painting : Jose Maria Lojo Mestre, Music : Josep M. Vila i Torrens
 1989 - Sculpture : Teresa Riba Tomàs
 1990 - Music : Jordi Rife Santaló, Painting : Neus Martin Royo
 1991 - Sculpture : Albert Vall Martinez
 1992 - Painting : Monica Castanys Font, Music : Francesc Puig Forcada
 1993 - Sculpture : Judith Corominas Ayala, Painting : Eulalia Borrut Cases
 1994 - Music : Isabel Maynes i Miracle, Sculpture : Silvia Vilaseca Vilaseca
 1995 - Painting : Maria del Mar Saiz Ardanaz, Sculpture : Mercè Bessó Carreras
 1996- Engraving : Jesus Francisco Cortaguera, Painting : Hugo Bustamante Isla, Sculpture : Rebeca Muñoz Carrilero
 1997 - Painting : Marta Lafuente i Cuenca
 1998 - Sculpture : Jordi Egea Izquierdo
 1999 - Painting : Laura Badell Giralt
 2000 - Sculpture : Rosa M. Bessó Carreras

Bibliography 

Gary Wray McDonogh. Good Families of Barcelona: A Social History of Power in the Industrial Era. Princeton University Press 1986

External Links & References 

Oficial Web Site of the Güell Foundation

Saint George Royal Catalan Academy of Fine Arts

Foundations based in Catalonia
Arts in Catalonia